Erodium sosnowskianum, or Sosonovskiy's heron's-bill, is a herbaceous plant, a species of the genus Erodium of the family Geraniaceae.

Distribution 
It is narrowly endemic, known in only two habitats in the mountains of Armenia.

Taxonomy 
The species was first described by Andrei Fedorov in the 10th volume of Notes on the Geography and Systematics of the Tbilisi Botanical Institute, published in 1941.
It was named after botanist-systematics, researcher of flora of the Caucasus D. I. Sosnovsky.

References 

sosnowskianum